Matthew Behrmann (born August 3, 1980) is an American former professional tennis player.

Behrmann grew up in Indianapolis and played collegiate tennis at the University of Florida. His only ATP Tour main draw appearance came as a qualifier at the 2003 RCA Championships in his native Indianapolis, where he lost in the first round to Cyril Saulnier. He reached a career high singles ranking of 536 and won two ITF Futures titles.

ITF Futures titles

Singles: (2)

References

External links
 
 

1980 births
Living people
American male tennis players
Florida Gators men's tennis players
Tennis players from Indianapolis